Luis María de Larrea y Legarreta (19 April 1918 – 28 May 2009) was a Spanish Bishop of the Roman Catholic Church. At the age of 91, he was one of the oldest bishops in the Church.

Luis María de Larrea y Legarreta was born in Miravalles, Spain, and was ordained as a priest on 27 June 1943. He was appointed Bishop of the Diocese of León on 9 July 1971, and was ordained on 25 September 1971. On 16 February 1979 Legarreta was appointed to the Diocese of Bilbao, where he remained until his retirement on 8 September 1995.

References

External links
Catholic Hierarchy 
Bilboa Diocese
Leon Diocese

1918 births
2009 deaths
20th-century Roman Catholic bishops in Spain